Arbor is an unincorporated community in Lancaster County, Nebraska, United States.

History
Arbor may be named from Arbor Lodge, the estate of Julius Sterling Morton, the 3rd United States Secretary of Agriculture. However, another source speculates that Arbor was likely named for the trees lining the town site.  Arbor had a post office from 1894 until 1900.

References

Unincorporated communities in Lancaster County, Nebraska
Unincorporated communities in Nebraska